The urial (Ovis vignei), also known as the arkars or shapo, is a wild sheep native to Central and South Asia. It is listed as Vulnerable on the IUCN Red List.

Characteristics 

Urial males have large horns, curling outwards from the top of the head turning in to end somewhere behind the head; females have shorter, compressed horns.

Distribution and habitat
It prefers grassland, open woodland and gentle slopes, but also inhabits cold arid zones with little vegetation.

Behaviour and ecology 
The mating season begins in September. Rams select four or five ewes, which give birth to a lamb after a gestation of five months.

Taxonomy
 Ovis vignei was the scientific name proposed by Edward Blyth in 1841 for wild sheep in the Sulaiman Mountains. The specific name honours Godfrey Vigne (1801–1863).
The vignei subspecies group consists of six individual subspecies:
Afghan urial or Turkmenian sheep (Ovis vignei cycloceros): southern Turkmenistan, eastern Iran, Afghanistan, north Balochistan Pakistan
Transcaspian urial (Ovis vignei arkal): Ustjurt-Plateau (Turkmenistan, Uzbekistan, northern Iran) and western Kazakhstan
Blanford's urial or Baluchistan urial (Ovis vignei blanfordi): Balochistan (Pakistan) are often included in this subspecies
Bukhara urial (Ovis vignei bochariensis): Uzbekistan, Tajikistan, Turkmenistan, mountains around Amu Darya
Punjab urial (Ovis vignei punjabiensis): the provincial animal of the Punjab (Pakistan)
Ladakh urial (Ovis vignei vignei): Ladakh and northern Pakistan, Kashmir, males have curly horns but the females have flat horns
 -->

References

 Nowak R. M.: Walker's Mammals of the World, Sixth Edition. The Johns Hopkins University Press, Baltimore, London, 1999.
 Namgail, T., van Wieren, S.E., Mishra, C. & Prins, H.H.T. (2010). Multi-spatial co-distribution of the endangered Ladakh urial and blue sheep in the arid Trans-Himalayan Mountains. Journal of Arid Environments, 74:1162-1169.
 Lingen, H.: Großes Lexikon der Tiere. Lingen Verlag, Köln.
 Prater, S. H.: The Book of Indian Animals, Oxford University Press, 1971.
 Menon, V.: A Field Guide to Indian Mammals, Dorling Kindersley, India, 2003
 CITES Instruktion für den grenztierärztlichen Dienst
 Proposal about subspecies of Urial
 Yahya M. Musakhel et al. 2006: Identification of Biodiversity Hot Spots in Musakhel District balochistan Pakistan.

External links
 Images of asiatic wild sheep subspecies

Ovis
Mammals of Afghanistan
Mammals of Pakistan
Fauna of Iran
Fauna of Ladakh
Fauna of India
Mammals of Central Asia
Mammals described in 1841
Subspecies
Taxa named by Edward Blyth